The Devil All the Time is a 2020 American psychological thriller crime drama film directed by Antonio Campos, from a screenplay co-written with his brother Paulo Campos, based on the novel of the same name by Donald Ray Pollock. The film follows several characters whose stories weave together in two Southern Ohio towns during the period from the end of World War II to the 1960s. It features an ensemble cast that includes Tom Holland, Bill Skarsgård, Riley Keough, Jason Clarke, Sebastian Stan, Haley Bennett, Eliza Scanlen, Mia Wasikowska, and Robert Pattinson.

The Devil All the Time was released in select theaters on September 11, 2020, and on Netflix on September 16, 2020. It received mixed-to-positive reviews from critics, who praised the performances (particularly Holland and Pattinson) but were critical of the film's length and dark tone.

Plot
During World War II, while serving in the Solomon Islands, U.S. Marine Willard Russell finds Gunnery Sergeant Miller Jones skinned and crucified by Japanese soldiers. Willard ends Jones's agony by shooting him behind the ear. After the war, on his way home to Coal Creek, West Virginia, Willard passes through Meade, Ohio, where he meets Charlotte, a waitress at a diner, and a photographer named Carl Henderson. Willard and Charlotte marry and move to Knockemstiff, Ohio, where they have a son, whom they name Arvin.

In 1950, Helen Hatton marries Roy Laferty. Roy is a bizarre, albeit charismatic, evangelical preacher who pours venomous spiders over his head while giving sermons to demonstrate his faith in God. Helen and Roy have a daughter named Lenora. During a sermon, Roy is bitten by a spider on his face and has a severe allergic reaction that affects his grip on reality and he comes to believe that he has the ability to resurrect the dead. Roy takes Helen out in the woods and stabs her in the neck with a screwdriver before trying and failing to resurrect her. A distraught Roy hitchhikes and is picked up by Carl Henderson and his wife Sandy. Carl and Sandy are revealed to be serial killers who pick up male hitchhikers and encourage them to have sex with Sandy while Carl takes photographs before murdering them. Roy refuses to have sex with Sandy but Carl shoots and kills him anyway.

In 1957, Charlotte is diagnosed with cancer. Willard believes he can influence God with fervent prayer to remove the cancer from his wife's body. He prays to God and sacrifices Arvin's dog on a rustic cross he had erected in the woods behind his house. Charlotte dies despite his efforts, and Willard commits suicide by slitting his throat. Arvin, now orphaned, goes to live with his grandmother Emma, who has also adopted Lenora.

In 1965, Arvin is given his father's Luger pistol as a birthday present. He is fiercely protective of Lenora who is bullied by some local greasers, prompting Arvin to attack and beat them all mercilessly. Lenora grows close to the new, narcissistic Reverend Preston Teagardin. Preston seduces and rapes Lenora—she later becomes pregnant. When she informs Preston, he denies her. Not wanting to bring shame to her family, Lenora plans to take her own life by hanging herself. At the last second, she decides not to go through with suicide, but as she attempts to undo the noose, she slips off her support and dies. After the autopsy, Arvin is told that she was pregnant and suspects that Preston was the father. He follows Preston and sees him seduce and rape another underage girl.

At church, Arvin confronts Preston about Lenora and shoots and kills him with the Luger before fleeing. Arvin hitchhikes and is picked up by Carl and Sandy. Arvin notices that Carl is carrying a gun. As Carl begins the pair's ritual, Arvin shoots and kills both Carl and Sandy in self-defense. In the car's glove compartment, he finds a collection consisting of several rolls of film. Sandy's brother, corrupt Sheriff Lee Bodecker, learns about her murder. To protect himself and his coming reelection, he goes to Carl and Sandy's apartment where he finds and burns Carl's photo collection.

Arvin travels to Meade to visit his childhood home. Lee learns that Arvin murdered Preston with the same caliber pistol that was used to kill Carl and Sandy, and concludes that Arvin was the shooter in both instances. Lee tracks Arvin to Meade, and, armed with a shotgun, confronts him in the woods at Willard's rustic cross. A shootout ensues and Arvin shoots Lee in the stomach with the Luger. Before Lee dies, Arvin shows Lee the picture of Sandy with Roy's dead body. He leaves the photo and rolls of film so that evidence of Carl and Sandy's serial killing spree can be revealed.

Arvin hitchhikes and is picked up by a hippie. As he rides in the passenger seat, the exhausted Arvin struggles to stay awake. He daydreams and contemplates his future as possibly a husband or serving in the Vietnam War before falling asleep.

Cast

Production
Production for The Devil All the Time was announced in September 2018, with Tom Holland, Robert Pattinson, Chris Evans and Mia Wasikowska in talks to star. Antonio Campos was set to write and direct the film, with Jake Gyllenhaal serving as producer. In January 2019, Bill Skarsgård and Eliza Scanlen joined the cast, and Netflix was set to distribute the film. Sebastian Stan was cast to replace Evans, after scheduling conflicts caused him to drop out and personally recommended Stan for the role. Additionally, Jason Clarke, Riley Keough and Haley Bennett were announced as part of the cast, and in March 2019, Harry Melling also joined. Danny Bensi and Saunder Jurriaans composed the film's score.

Principal photography began on February 19, 2019, in Alabama, with filming locations including Anniston, Pell City, Birmingham, and Montevallo. Filming completed on April 15, 2019.

Visual style 
Campos stated that visual inspiration from the film mainly stemmed from the visual descriptions that Pollock provided in the novel itself. "The book kind of offers these amazing moments and images, things like, the prayer log, Carl's photographs in the book," Campos stated, "it gets your mind going." The film's visual style is inspired by painter Andrew Wyeth and photographer William Eggleston. Campos stated that the scenes that were inspired by Eggleston's work were mainly due to how colorful they were. Appalachia itself also inspired Campos and company when they were considering the visuals in the film. Campos wanted the film to mirror what the Appalachia looked like during the timeline when the story takes place.

Release
The Devil All the Time was released in select theaters on September 11, 2020, and digitally, on Netflix, on September 16, 2020.

The film was the most-watched on Netflix over its first two days, and third overall in its first five days. In November 2020, Variety reported the film was the 22nd-most watched straight-to-streaming title of 2020 up to that point.

Reception
The website's critics consensus reads, "The Devil All the Times descent into darkness can be harrowing to the point of punishment, but it's offset by strong work from a stellar cast." On Metacritic, the film has a weighted average score of 55 out of 100, based on 39 critics, indicating "mixed or average reviews".

The Chicago Tribunes Michael Phillips wrote, "It's easy on the eyes... worth seeing for an intriguingly cast ensemble, authenticating the milieu as much as possible. Holland's terrific, taking in each new setback in [his character's] life without revealing the full extent of the damage."

Ryan Lattanzio of IndieWire gave The Devil All the Time a "C−" and called it "colossal misfire, a sweaty mess from start to finish," although he praised Holland and Pattinson's performances. Owen Gleiberman of Variety said that "it's hard to imagine how a movie with this much sordid crime and violence could be this rote" and wrote "The Devil All the Time shows us a lot of bad behavior, but the movie isn't really interested in what makes the sinners tick. And without that lurid curiosity, it's just a series of Sunday School lessons: a noir that wants to scrub away the darkness."

References

External links
 
 

2020 films
2020 psychological thriller films
American psychological thriller films
English-language Netflix original films
Films about child abuse
Films about death
Films based on American novels
Films critical of religion
Films directed by Antonio Campos
Films set in 1945
Films set in 1950
Films set in 1957
Films set in 1965
Films set in Ohio
Films shot in Alabama
Films set in West Virginia
American World War II films
Southern Gothic films
Films critical of Christianity and Christians
2020s English-language films
2020s American films